Vicky Neale is a British mathematician and writer. She is Whitehead Lecturer at Oxford's Mathematical Institute and Supernumerary Fellow at Balliol College. Her research specialty is number theory. The author of the 2017 book Closing the Gap: The Quest to Understand Prime Numbers, she has been interviewed on several BBC radio programs as a mathematics expert. In addition, she has written for The Conversation and The Guardian. Her other educational and outreach activities include lecturing at the PROMYS Europe high-school program and helping to organize the European Girls' Mathematical Olympiad.

Neale obtained her PhD in 2011 from the University of Cambridge. Her thesis work, supervised by Ben Joseph Green, concerned Waring's problem. She then taught at Cambridge while being Director of Studies in mathematics at Murray Edwards College, before moving to Oxford in the summer of 2014.

References 

21st-century British mathematicians
Additive combinatorialists
Fellows of Balliol College, Oxford
Living people
Year of birth missing (living people)